Agata Pietrzyk (born July 27, 1988) is a Polish female freestyle wrestler (59 kg). She won a bronze medal on 2008 FILA Wrestling World Championships.

References

 Wrestler bio on Team USA
 Wrestler Images on Getty Images

Living people
1988 births
Polish female sport wrestlers
Place of birth missing (living people)
World Wrestling Championships medalists
21st-century Polish women